The ABBA Generation is the debut studio album by Swedish pop group A-Teens. It was released on 25 August 1999 by Stockholm Records. The album is composed of cover versions of well-known ABBA songs. The album spawned four singles, "Mamma Mia", "Gimme! Gimme! Gimme! (A Man After Midnight)", "Super Trouper", and "Dancing Queen".

Critical reception

Despite its commercial success around the world, the album received overwhelmingly negative reviews from music critics. Giving the album three out of five stars, Alex Henderson of AllMusic said that the groups "versions of ABBA gems like "Take a Chance on Me", "Mamma Mia", "Dancing Queen", and "Voulez-Vous" aren't brilliant, but they're enjoyable—and they show just how well the songs have held up over time." He concluded his review by saying, “All things considered, The ABBA Generation is a pleasing, if unremarkable, testament to the durability of ABBA's songs." In an average review for The A.V. Club, Steven Thompson wrote, "Pop music doesn't get more marginal than a collection of overdriven dance-pop covers, but The ABBA Generation succeeds on its own modest terms." David Hiltbrand of Entertainment Weekly gave the album a B+, saying that the group "look and sound better than their supergroup heroes; even the music is spruced up, thanks to a cast of savvy Swedish producers." Writing for Rolling Stone, Arion Berger gave the album one and a half out of five stars, saying that "all the keyboard doodling and note-for-note diligence in Scandinavia wouldn't help these poseurs bring the pure-pop greatness of the real ABBA to life."

Track listing 
All tracks written by Benny Andersson and Björn Ulvaeus, except as noted.

Personnel
Adapted from the album liner notes.

Musicians
Anneli Axon
Anders Barrén
Tee
Image
Ronald Malmberg
Annika Sjölin
Katarina Sjölin

Production
Per Adebratt – vocal production
Stefan Boman – engineer
Tommy Ekman – vocal production
Björn Engelmann – mastering
Ole Evenrude — producer
Tommy Gustavsson — programming
Hartmann & Langhoff – producer
Johan S. – producer
Thomas Johansson — producer, vocal production
Fredrik Larnemo – engineer
Hugo Lira — programming
Ronald Malmberg — producer, vocal production
Christer Sandelin – vocal production
Joakim Styrén – mixing, programming

Other personnel
Niklas Berg – concept
Todd Gallopo – design
Anders Johansson – A&R
Christer Mellström – product coordinator
Mats Oscarsson – photos

Charts

Weekly charts

Year-end charts

Certifications and sales

Release history 
 August 25, 1999 (Sweden)
 May 16, 2000 (USA)

References

A-Teens albums
1999 debut albums
ABBA tribute albums